This is a list of fellows of the Royal Society elected in 1711.

Fellows
 Fettiplace Bellers (1687–1752)
 Ludwig Friedrich Bonet (d. 1773)
 William Cheselden (1688–1752)
 Peter Colleton (1643–1718)
 Roger Cotes (1682–1716)
 John Craig (d. 1731)
 Walter Douglas (1670–1739)
 Thomas Greene (d. 1745)
 Samuel Hill (1648–1716)
 William Jones (1675–1749)
 Linda (fl. 1711)
 Alexander Sandilands (d. 1760)
 Marmaduke Wyvill, 5th Baronet (d. 1722)

References

1711
1711 in science
1711 in England